Jean A. Milko is Vice Chair of the Pennsylvania Democratic Party.

Milko is from Pittsburgh, Allegheny County. She was a
delegate to the Democratic National Convention from Pennsylvania in 1972, 2000, 2004, and 2008, and a member of the Democratic National Committee from Pennsylvania in 2004.

References

Living people
Pennsylvania Democrats
Women in Pennsylvania politics
Year of birth missing (living people)
21st-century American women